Henri Le Breton (10 September 1928 – 18 October 2022) was a French politician of the Union for French Democracy (UDF).

Biography
A professional animator, he was elected to the Senate in 1981, succeeding Raymond Marcellin who had been elected to the National Assembly. He joined the Centrist Union group and became a member of the Social Affairs Committee. He was re-elected in 1983 and 1992, and did not stand for a fourth term in 2001.

Le Breton died on 18 October 2022, at the age of 94.

Awards
Knight of the Legion of Honour (2006)
Knight of the Ordre national du Mérite
Officer of the Order of Agricultural Merit

References

1928 births
2022 deaths
Union for French Democracy politicians
French Senators of the Fifth Republic
Senators of Morbihan
Recipients of the Legion of Honour
Knights of the Ordre national du Mérite
Recipients of the Order of Agricultural Merit